Carmen Molina may refer to:
Carmen Molina (Breaking Bad), a character in Breaking Bad
Carmen Molina (actress) (1920–1998), Mexican actress